On November 28, 2018, 13-year-old Max Benson (October 2005—30 November 2018), an autistic boy from Davis, California, died as a result of being held in an extended prone physical restraint by staff at his now-defunct K-12 non-public school, Guiding Hands School in El Dorado County, California. During the extended physical restraint, Benson became unresponsive. According to the investigation conducted by the California Department of Education, which afterward suspended Guiding Hands School's certification, Benson was held in a prone restraint for an extended period of time, and was forced to urinate on himself and vomit. Guiding Hands staff failed to call emergency services promptly after Benson became unconscious. Benson was taken to the UC Davis Medical Center, where he subsequently died. Three staff from Guiding Hands School are facing criminal charges in Benson's death, including felony manslaughter; a civil lawsuit has also been filed against Guiding Hands and several former employees, as well as with Northern California school districts that contracted with the school.

Death

Cause

On November 28, 2018, staff at Guiding Hands school held Max Benson in a prone (face-down) physical restraint for more than 90 minutes.  While being restrained, Benson vomited and urinated on himself before becoming unconscious. According to a civil lawsuit filed against Guiding Hands School, it took 10 minutes for a school nurse to arrive after staff called for help, and the school failed to call paramedics until nearly a half hour after Benson lost consciousness. Emergency services transported Benson first to Mercy Hospital in Folsom, California, then to UC Davis Medical Center in Sacramento, where Benson was pronounced dead 2 days after the restraint.

Vigils
In December 2018, vigils were held for Benson outside of Guiding Hands School and in Davis, California, where Benson had lived with his family. Attendees mourned his death and called for an end to the use of restraints in schools. Many attended because they knew and loved Benson and his family, while others came to call attention to what they described as a "lack of educational resources for students with autism within the school district." Max's family did not attend the vigil, but expressed through a family friend their appreciation to those who did, “and for sharing their fond memories of Max."

Another vigil was held in Placerville, California for Benson nearly a year after his death. Some people wore blue shirts with a photo of Benson and text that read, “What you permit, you promote,” referring to the complicity they said schools and teachers engage in by allowing aggressive and prone restraints on students. Vigil organizers said the International Coalition Against Restraint and Seclusion announced worldwide vigils in honor and remembrance of Max. Several people sent in letters of support, some of them strangers, and lit candles to call for justice and policy changes.

Investigations and criminal charges

California Department of Education Investigation 
Shortly after Benson's death, the California Department of Education (CDE) suspended Guiding Hands School's certification due to the school's failure to notify the CDE in writing of the circumstances surrounding Benson's death, and violation of multiple state rules regarding the use of physical restraints on students. The CDE had also investigated other complaints about the treatment of students at the school.

Criminal charges 
On November 12, 2019, El Dorado County prosecutors filed charges, including felony involuntary manslaughter, against Guiding Hands School site administrator Cindy Keller, school principal Starrane Meyers, and Kimberly Wohlwend, the teacher accused of being among those who restrained Benson. El Dorado County Superior Court Judge Mark Ralphs ordered that the accused not teach school or daycare while the case is pending. If convicted, Keller, Meyers, and Wohlwend could face up to four years in state prison. Charges were also filed against the school as an entity. As of January 2022, court proceedings were ongoing in the case. In July 2022, a criminal grand jury in El Dorado County indicted all three defendants on charges of involuntary manslaughter.  The jury trial is scheduled to begin in February 28, 2023, in Placerville, California.

Civil lawsuit 
A civil suit was filed in November 2019 against Guiding Hands School and several former employees, including Meyers, Keller, and Wohlwend. The suit was filed on behalf of Benson's family and other families of Guiding Hands students and alleges that Wohlwend restrained Benson with the assistance of other school staff members, including Jill Watson, Betty Morgan and Le’Mon Thomas. The suit also names area school districts that contracted with and sent students to Guiding Hands School, along with the California Department of Education and special education administrative bodies in Yolo County and Amador County. Davis Joint Unified School District Special Education Administrators Patrick McGrew, Jennifer Galas and Riley Chessman were also named as defendants. From January to July 2022, the case was pending in the U.S. District Court for the Eastern District of California.

References

2018 controversies in the United States
Education controversies in the United States
Child abuse resulting in death
Incidents of violence against boys